Innsbrook Pavilion, also known as Innsbrook After Hours, is a 8,500-capacity outdoor music venue located in Glen Allen, Virginia. Well-known acts have performed at the pavilion, such as Hall & Oates, Ted Nugent, Kansas, David Lee Roth and Cheap Trick. It opened in 1985.

References

External links
 Official website

Music venues in Virginia